NWS Holdings Limited is the conglomerate flagship of New World Development. It was established in 2002 when its predecessor, Pacific Ports Company Limited, acquired New World Services Limited from New World Development and the infrastructure assets from New World Infrastructure Limited. The company is headed by Henry Cheng, the elder son of Dr Cheng Yu-tung, the chairman of New World Development. 

The company invests and operates a wide range of businesses predominantly in Hong Kong and the Mainland. Business includes toll roads, construction and insurance, while they also manage a strategic portfolio spanning sectors from logistics to facilities management. 

Business units include:

Construction:  Hip Hing Construction 

Insurance: FTLife 

Logistics : ATL Logistics Centre

Facilities Management: the management of Hong Kong Convention and Exhibition Centre ; Free Duty, Gleneagles Hong Kong Hospital

Before 2020, the company was involved in infrastructure and service businesses in Hong Kong, Mainland China and Macau. Its infrastructure division included roads, energy, water and ports projects. Its service division comprisedfacilities management , construction (Hip Hing Construction and NWS Engineering), finance (Taifook Securities and New World Insurance) and transportation (Citybus, New World First Bus and New World First Ferry). 

NWS has been optimizing its business portfolio since 2018. In August 2020, the Citybus and New World First Bus subsidiaries were sold to Bravo Transport. NWS sold New World First Ferry to Chu Kong Shipping in 2020. NWS has exited the environmental segment after disposing of its major assets, SUZE NWS in 2021.

Corporate affairs
Its head office is in the 21/F, NCB Innovation Centre, 888 Lai Chi Kok Road, Cheung Sha Wan, Kowloon, Hong Kong.

References

External links 
 

 
Companies listed on the Hong Kong Stock Exchange
Companies established in 2002
Conglomerate companies of China
Logistics companies of China
New World Development subsidiaries
Property management companies
2002 establishments in Hong Kong
Conglomerate companies of Hong Kong